William Blumberg and Max Schnur were the defending champions but only Blumberg chose to defend his title, partnering Ben Shelton. Blumberg lost in the semifinals to Constantin Frantzen and Reese Stalder.

Julian Cash and Henry Patten won the title after defeating Frantzen and Stalder 6–4, 7–6(7–1) in the final.

Seeds

Draw

References

External links
 Main draw

Las Vegas Challenger - Doubles
2022 Doubles